Firmin Aristophane Boulon (published as Aristophane, the French name of Aristophanes) was a Guadeloupe-born cartoonist.  A graduate of the French schools École nationale supérieure des Beaux-Arts and European School of Visual Arts, he began work "preoccupied with evil and frailty as viewed through the lives of demons and mythological creatures."

His 1996 novel, Les sœurs Zabîme, is about children in Guadeloupe and considered a "small masterpiece." It was his final completed work.

In school he had been told, "Everything was already explored in painting, everything was already done. The future lies in comics."

Works
Parutions Dans le Lézard, le Cheval sans Tête, Lapin, Bananas
Logorrhée
Tu Rêves Lili (1993)
Faune, ou l'histoire d'un immorale (1995)
Un Grand Projet (1995)
Conte Démoniaque (1996)
Les sœurs Zabîme (1996)
The Zabîme Sisters (translated by Matt Madden (2010)

References

1967 births
2004 deaths
Guadeloupean cartoonists
20th-century French novelists
20th-century French male writers